Polina Viktorovna Kuznetsova (née Vyakhireva; born 10 June 1987) is a Russian handball player for Rostov-Don and the Russian national team. She won gold medals with the Russian national team at the 2016 Rio Olympics and 2005 and 2007 world championships, and was included into the 2007 championship's All-Star Team. She retired from the national team, in August 2021.

She competes internationally alongside her sister Anna Vyakhireva.

Individual awards
All-Star Left Wing of the World Championship: 2007
All-Star Left Wing of the European Championship: 2012
 Team of the Tournament Left Wing of the Bucharest Trophy: 2014
All-Star Left Wing of the Summer Olympics: 2016, 2020

References

External links

Russian female handball players
1987 births
Living people
Handball players at the 2016 Summer Olympics
Handball players at the 2020 Summer Olympics
Medalists at the 2016 Summer Olympics
Medalists at the 2020 Summer Olympics
Olympic medalists in handball
Olympic gold medalists for Russia
Olympic handball players of Russia
Expatriate handball players
Russian expatriate sportspeople in North Macedonia
Olympic silver medalists for the Russian Olympic Committee athletes
21st-century Russian women